Shaykh Abdullah Hakim Quick (born June 20, 1949) is an American-Canadian  Imam and travelling lecturer.

Background 
He was born in Cambridge, Massachusetts of African American, Caribbean and Mohawk descent. He grew up in Boston.

He received a Bachelor's Degree from the Islamic University of Madinah in 1979. He was one of the first two students from the west and the first American to have done so and receive an Ijazah. He received a Master's Degree and PhD from the University of Toronto. His thesis was an analysis of the life and writings of Sheikh ‘Uthman Dan Fodio, a great West African Scholar, warrior, and social activist.

Career 
Over the past four decades Quick has travelled to 61 countries where he lectured at universities, mosques and at public events. He has also served as an imam, teacher, counsellor and media consultant in the USA, Canada, South Africa and the West Indies. He is currently senior lecturer with the Islamic Institute of Toronto (I.I.T.) and the outreach coordinator with the Canadian Council of Imams. He is also the history department head and a lecturer at AlMaghrib Institute and advisory committee member at International Open University.

Threats
Quick was listed in ISIS's hit list on an issue of Dabiq, with ISIS encouraging his death.

References

External links

1949 births
Living people
American historians
American imams
Canadian imams
Converts to Islam
People from Cambridge, Massachusetts
People from Boston
Islamic University of Madinah alumni
University of Toronto alumni
American people of Caribbean descent
American people of Native American descent
Canadian people of Caribbean descent
Canadian people of Native American descent
African-American Muslims
American emigrants to Canada